Federal Route 164 or Lencongan Putra 2, is a major federal road in Kuah town, Langkawi Island, Kedah, Malaysia.

Features

At most sections, the Federal Route 164 was built under the JKR R5 road standard with a speed limit of 90 km/h.

List of junctions and town

References

Malaysian Federal Roads
Roads in Langkawi